Juan Ramón Fernández (born 5 March 1980) is an Argentine former professional football who played as a right back. He won one cap for Argentina national team

Career
Fernández started his career with Estudiantes de La Plata in 1998, in 1999 he played a friendly match for the Argentina national football team under Marcelo Bielsa's coaching. In 2002, Fernández he was sold to Borussia Dortmund in Germany.

Fernández then played for River Plate, San Lorenzo, Olimpo de Bahía Blanca, Colón and Argentinos Juniors, all of them in the Argentine Primera División.

References

External links
 
 Argentine Primera statistics  
 

1980 births
Living people
Sportspeople from Entre Ríos Province
Association football defenders
Argentine sportspeople of Spanish descent
Argentine footballers
Argentine expatriate footballers
Argentina youth international footballers
Argentina under-20 international footballers
Argentina international footballers
Estudiantes de La Plata footballers
Borussia Dortmund players
Club Atlético River Plate footballers
San Lorenzo de Almagro footballers
Olimpo footballers
Deportes Iquique footballers
Club Atlético Colón footballers
Argentinos Juniors footballers
Atlético de Rafaela footballers
Expatriate footballers in Chile
Expatriate footballers in Germany
Expatriate footballers in Greece
Chilean Primera División players
Argentine Primera División players
Bundesliga players
Argentine expatriate sportspeople in Germany
Argentine expatriate sportspeople in Greece